Saari (literally Island) is a former municipality of Finland.

It was located in the province of Southern Finland and is part of the South Karelia region. The municipality had a population of 1,411 (2003) and covered an area of 183.08 km2 of which 15.70 km2 is water. The population density was 8.4 inhabitants per km2.

The municipality was unilingually Finnish.

Saari was annexed to Parikkala and Uukuniemi municipalities on 1 January 2005. The new municipality was named Parikkala.

Notable people
Aleksanteri Aava (1883–1956), poet
Jorma Härkönen (born 1956), middle-distance runner
Olavi Litmanen (born 1945), footballer and the father of Jari Litmanen
Suvi Mikkonen (born 1988), taekwondo practitioner
 (born 1934), philologist and university teacher

External links

Parikkala, Saari and Uukuniemi

Populated places disestablished in 2005
Former municipalities of Finland